Kampong Kianggeh is a neighbourhood in Bandar Seri Begawan, the capital of Brunei. It is also a village in Brunei-Muara District, within Mukim Kianggeh. The population was 1,421 in 2016. It is home to Kianggeh Market, a prominent traditional market in the country.

Market 
The market mainly sells produce, fish, meat and local foods. It has existed since the 1960s; it is believed to be the oldest market in the country.

The new complex was built as a modern and more organised replacement to the previous facilities. It was reported that the market was originally planned to be relocated to Gadong but scrapped after receiving opposition from the local vendors.

Kianggeh Market is regarded as a tourist attraction in Brunei. It was visited by Queen Elizabeth II during her state visit to Brunei in 1998. It was also visited by the British chef Antony Worrall Thompson and featured in his TV travel documentary Antony Worrall Thompson: Adventures in Brunei which was aired in Discovery TLC in 2011.

References 

Neighbourhoods in Bandar Seri Begawan
Villages in Brunei-Muara District